The Very Best of Bonnie Tyler Volume 2 is a compilation album by Welsh singer Bonnie Tyler. It was released on 14 February 1994 by Columbia Records as a follow-up to The Very Best of Bonnie Tyler, released in the previous year.

Content

Released in 1994, this is the follow-up to the successful 1993 edition.  This album covers more of Tyler's recent work compared with the previous collection, including a 1984 single released for the Metropolis soundtrack entitled "Here She Comes".  Other singles include "The Best" (which became an eventual Tina Turner hit) and "Faster Than the Speed of Night".  Six tracks come from her pre-Steinman work, including the spectacular "A Natural Woman".

Track listing

Charts

References

1993 compilation albums
Bonnie Tyler compilation albums